Mecysmaucheniidae is a family of araneomorph spiders first described by Eugène Simon in 1895. Most genera occur in South America (Chile and Argentina), with two genera endemic to New Zealand.

Genera

, the World Spider Catalog accepts the following genera:

Aotearoa Forster & Platnick, 1984 – New Zealand
Chilarchaea Forster & Platnick, 1984 – Chile, Argentina
Mecysmauchenioides Forster & Platnick, 1984 – Chile, Argentina
Mecysmauchenius Simon, 1884 – Chile, Argentina
Mesarchaea Forster & Platnick, 1984 – Chile
Semysmauchenius Forster & Platnick, 1984 – Chile
Zearchaea Wilton, 1946 – New Zealand

See also
 List of Mecysmaucheniidae species

References

Further reading 
</ref>

 

 
Araneomorphae families